Herringshaw is a surname. Notable people with the surname include:

John Herringshaw (1892–1974), English cricketer
Thomas William Herringshaw (1858–1927), American journalist, publisher, genealogist, and biographical author

English toponymic surnames